Savitree Srichure (born 11 August 1975) is a Thai sprinter. She competed in the women's 4 × 100 metres relay at the 1996 Summer Olympics.

References

1975 births
Living people
Athletes (track and field) at the 1996 Summer Olympics
Savitree Srichure
Savitree Srichure
Place of birth missing (living people)
Asian Games medalists in athletics (track and field)
Savitree Srichure
Athletes (track and field) at the 1998 Asian Games
Medalists at the 1998 Asian Games
Olympic female sprinters
Savitree Srichure
Savitree Srichure